Diazonidae is a family of sea squirts belonging to the suborder Phlebobranchia.

Genera
Genera in the family Diazonidae include:
 Diazona Savigny, 1816
 Pseudodiazona Millar, 1963
 Pseudorhopalaea Millar, 1975
 Rhopalaea Philippi, 1843
 Tylobranchion Herdman, 1886

References

Enterogona
Tunicate families